Events in the year 2010 in Kerala

Incumbents 
Governor of Kerala - R. S. Gavai

Chief minister of Kerala - V. S. Achuthanandan

Events 

 January 2 - Taluk hospital at Manjeri upgraded as District Hospital, Manjeri.
 April 4 - Institute of Fashion Technology Kerala opened at Vellimon, Kollam district.
 May 4 - Kerala Maritime Institute established at Neendakara.
 May 12 - Kollam–Punalur broadgauge rail inaugurated by E. Ahamed.
 July 4 - Assault on T. J. Joseph by Popular Front of India activists in the name of Blasphemy.
 August 8 - Malabar Wildlife Sanctuary created as 16th wildlife sanctuary in Kerala.
 August 15 - Nilakal Orthodox Diocese created.
 Kochi Tuskers Kerala founded as an Indian Premier League team.

Deaths 

 13 April - Santhosh Jogi, 34, actor.
 23 December - K. Karunakaran, 92, politician.

See also 

 History of Kerala
 2010 in India

References 

2010s in Kerala